The Jewish Democratic Council of America (JDCA), also known as "Jewish Dems", is an organization that defines itself as "the voice for Jewish Democrats and socially progressive, pro-Israel, and Jewish values". It was announced in August 2017, and officially launched in November 2017. JDCA was incorporated in Washington, D. C., in June 2017. JDCA has 15 chapters across the United States.

Purpose
The organization's official mission is to serve as the voice for Jewish Democrats. According to its website, it "promotes like-minded candidates and elected officials and embraces a platform that is grounded in fairness, integrity, the Jewish value of Tikkun Olam, and a strong U.S.–Israel relationship, energizes the Jewish electorate to engage in the electoral and legislative processes, and maintains a commitment to positive change through information sharing, issue advocacy, rapid response, and research, messaging, briefings, and other activities to increase Jewish community engagement in policy and support elected-officials and candidates who share our values". JDCA says that it "serves as the voice for Jewish Democrats and the socially liberal, pro-Israel values that Jewish voters hold dear, the leading voice for Jewish Democrats and socially progressive, pro-Israel and Jewish values". The organization's platform lists policies on numerous topics; among them are education, health care, paid family leave, taxes, climate change, Israel, Iran, fighting anti-Semitism, Holocaust education, immigration, criminal justice reform, racial justice, and reproductive rights.

Background
The JDCA is the unofficial successor to the National Jewish Democratic Council, but the organizations are not affiliated.

JDCA was announced in August 2017, in response to President Donald Trump's failure to condemn white nationalist and neo-Nazi demonstrators for violence which took place during the "Unite the Right" rally in Charlottesville, Virginia, and it was formally launched in November 2017. Halie Soifer, JDCA's first executive director, explained the catalyst for JDCA's formation, stating that "at that moment, it was very clear, unlike even past Republican administrations, this administration had no qualms about affiliating itself and even sympathizing with anti-Semites". Ron Klein, chair of JDCA, has written that American Jews can not afford to be "complacent" in the wake of Donald Trump's election, and must be "on the front-lines of fighting for justice and equality". In his fund-raising appeal for the JDCA, he wrote that "President Trump must be held accountable".

In its launch statement, JDCA said that it would "actively promote to Democratic officeholders and candidates national and local legislative policies consistent with the Jewish community's values, as well as a strong US-Israel relationship".

The organization's inaugural press release said that Trump's rhetoric and tolerance of neo-Nazis, white supremacists, and racists will "empower and embolden" such groups. It criticized the "deafening silence" from some members of Congress and Trump's cabinet, and accused those who refuse to speak out of abdicating "their constitutional and moral obligation to our country and its citizens".

U.S. Sen. Chuck Schumer (D-N.Y.) issued a statement saying he looks forward to working with the JDCA on "issues that are important to all Americans, including maintaining the strong U.S.-Israel relationship, curtailing Iran's malign activities, and combating anti-Semitism".

Organization
The JDCA is chaired by former Florida congressman Ron Klein. In June 2018, JDCA announced that it had hired its first executive director, Halie Soifer, a former national security advisor for U.S. Senator Kamala Harris and senior policy advisor in the Obama administration. In 2020, Halie Soifer was promoted to CEO.

As of July 2021, the Executive Committee of JDCA's board included Ron Klein, Barbara Goldberg Goldman, Beth Kieffer Leonard, Diane (Dede) Feinberg, Ada Horwich, Israel "Izzy" Klein, Marcia Riklis, Michael Rosenzweig, and Susie Stern.

Several of the board members were also involved with the National Jewish Democratic Council and "Jews for Progress".

Launch event
JDCA's launch event was attended by many high-profile members of Congress, including Nancy Pelosi, Ben Cardin, Tim Kaine, Chris Murphy, Sherrod Brown, Steny Hoyer, and Debbie Wasserman Schultz. Over 20 elected Democratic leaders spoke at the event, which drew some 250 people. Senator Cardin (D-Md.), who is a member of the Senate Foreign Affairs Committee, stated the Democratic Party's objection to imposing "religious tests for who can come to America", but did not explicitly mention Trump's travel ban.

Israeli Ambassador Ron Dermer, who spoke at the event, said the group was a "strategic asset" for Israel. Although Republicans have accused Democrats of moving away from their traditionally pro-Israel positions, Dermer disagreed, saying that support for Israel within the Democratic Party was still strong.

Endorsements
In June 2018, JDCA announced its first round of endorsements for the 2018 mid-term elections. The four candidates who received endorsements were Bill Nelson, Jacky Rosen, Sean Casten, and Dean Phillips. The JDCA followed that set of endorsements with six more: Claire McCaskill, Sherrod Brown, Conor Lamb, Josh Gottheimer, Mikie Sherrill, and Tom Malinowski.

JDCA made 121 endorsements in the 2020 election, including Presidential Candidate Joe Biden and Congressional candidates such as Adam Schiff, Jamie Raskin, and Cory Booker. In the January 2021 Georgia run-off elections, JDCA endorsed and campaigned for Reverend Raphael Warnock and Jon Ossoff, helping Democrats to win the Senate majority.

In the 2022 midterms, JDCA has endorsed House, Senate, and Gubernatorial candidates in states across the country. Notable endorsements include Josh Shapiro, John Fetterman, Cheri Beasley, and Mark Kelly.

Advocacy
In June 2021, JDCA held its first Week of Action, during which it ran 81 meetings with members of Congress, including Gary Peters, Tim Ryan, and Ted Deutch.

JDCA held its second Week of Action in May 2022. Among others, they were joined by Jon Ossoff, Raphael Warnock, Val Demings, and Jamie Raskin.

Grass-roots voter mobilization
In the lead-up to the 2020 election, JDCA led many efforts in grass-roots voter mobilization across the U.S. Due to the COVID-19 pandemic, all of JDCA's election events were held virtually. Events included state chapter and young voters phone banks, as well as speaker series. In 2020, a JDCA "Take Back America: Jewish Votes Will Make the Difference", included the announcement of the "Virtual Schlep for 2020", to mobilize Jewish voters in Florida during the COVID-19 pandemic. Among the events speakers were U.S. Speaker of the House Nancy Pelosi, Senate Majority Leader Chuck Schumer, U.S. House Majority Leader Steny Hoyer, former U.S. Representative Steve Israel, and actors Ben Platt, Tovah Feldshuh, and Jon Lovett. Actor Mandy Patinkin participated in multiple JDCA events, and appeared in a JDCA ad to get out the vote.

Response from Republican groups
The Republican Jewish Coalition (RJC) sent an e-mail to its supporters, saying that JDCA was founded to revitalize two "failed liberal Jewish political groups". The RJC also said that founding a new organization would not reverse "the continued erosion of support for Israel within the Democrat Party". The JDCA responded by calling the letter "pitiful".

References

Democratic Party (United States) organizations
Jewish lobbying
Jewish-American political organizations